Les deux avares ("The Two Misers"), is an opéra bouffon in two acts written by André Grétry at age 27 in 1770 to a French libretto by Fenouillot de Falbaire and German version by Herbert Trantow.

Performance history
It was first performed at Fontainebleau on 27 October 1770.

Roles

Synopsis
Place: A public square in Smyrna
Time: 18th century

Martin, a speculator, and Gripon, a dodgy banker, are two greedy villains who collaborate to find treasure in the pyramid in Smyrna.  When Martin tells Gripon that there are no treasures in the pyramid, he doesn't believe him and thinks Martin tried to cheat him. He leaves Martin locked in the pyramid.  Jérôme and Henriette fall in love with each other but the only way out for their love is to escape from both Martin and Gripon. However, they are  delayed by various misfortunes. Gripon later finds out that he has been cheated and it is he of all people who conclude that there is no honesty in the world any more.

Operas by André Grétry
French-language operas
Opéras bouffons
Operas
Operas set in Turkey
1770 operas